In Darkness is the sixth studio album by the German symphonic black metal band Agathodaimon. It was released in 2013 on Massacre Records.

Track listing

Personnel
 Sathonys - guitars, clean vocals
 Ashtrael - vocals
 Thilo Feucht - guitars, keyboards
 Manuel Steitz - drums
 Till Ottinger - bass

Additional personnel and staff
 Kristian Kohlmannslehner - guitars, keyboards, backing vocals, producer, engineering, mixing
 Natalia Kempin - photography
 Hicham Haddaji - artwork, layout

External links
In Darkness at allmusic

Agathodaimon (band) albums
Massacre Records albums
2013 albums